Robin van Persie is a Dutch retired professional footballer, who represented the Netherlands as a striker.  He made his debut for his country in June 2005, coming on as a substitute for Ruud van Nistelrooy in a 2–0 victory over Romania. His first international goal came on his next appearance for the Netherlands, scoring the final goal in a 4–0 defeat of Finland in Helsinki during the qualification campaign for the 2006 FIFA World Cup. , van Persie is his country's top scorer (of the men’s team- the title of all time Netherlands top scorer belongs to Vivianne Miedema, with 95 goals for her country) with 50 goals in 102 appearances, ahead of Klaas-Jan Huntelaar (42 in 76) and former all-time top scorer Patrick Kluivert (40 in 79). Van Persie made his last appearance for the Netherlands in August 2017 in a 4–0 World Cup qualifier defeat to France.

Van Persie scored two hat-tricks during his international career. In September 2011, he scored four goals in an 11–0 victory against San Marino in a UEFA Euro 2012 qualifying match.  He also scored three goals in a 2014 FIFA World Cup qualifier against Hungary in an 8–1 win in October 2013. He also scored twice in a single match on seven occasions. Van Persie scored more goals against Hungary (six) than any other nation. Twenty of his goals were scored in the Johan Cruyff Arena (formally called the Amsterdam Arena).

Van Persie scored more goals in friendlies than in any other format, with fifteen. He scored thirteen goals in qualifying for both the FIFA World Cup and UEFA European Championship, six in FIFA World Cup finals and three in the UEFA Euro finals.

International goals
Scores and results list the Netherlands' goal tally first.

Hat-tricks

Statistics

References

Persie, Robin
Netherlands national football team records and statistics